Ayumi Hamasaki Stadium Tour 2002 A DVD was released on January 29, 2003, the same day as Ayumi Hamasaki Arena Tour 2002 A was also released.

Track listing
 UNITE!
 Fly high
 evolution
 MEDLEY - (WHATEVER 〜 too late 〜 monochrome 〜 End roll 〜 Depend on you 〜 Trauma 〜 vogue)
 July 1st
 independent
 Free & Easy
 M
 SURREAL
 HANABI
 Boys & Girls
 AUDIENCE

Encore
 A Song is born
 flower garden
 Trauma
 Who…

DVD bonus track
 SEASONS

Ayumi Hamasaki video albums
2003 video albums
Live video albums
2003 live albums